Chamberlin Iron Front Building is a historic commercial building located at Lewisburg, Union County, Pennsylvania.  It was built in 1868, and is a three-story, brick building with a two-story rear addition in the Italianate style.  It measures 56 feet wide and 160 feet deep.  The main section has a flat roof and the addition a gable roof.  It features a cast-iron front manufactured in Danville, Pennsylvania.  Over the years the building has housed a general store, shoe store, feed store, and post office, as well as fraternal organizations on the upper floors.

It was listed on the National Register of Historic Places in 1979.  It is located in the Lewisburg Historic District.

References

Cast-iron architecture in the United States
Commercial buildings on the National Register of Historic Places in Pennsylvania
Commercial buildings completed in 1868
Buildings and structures in Union County, Pennsylvania
Historic district contributing properties in Pennsylvania
National Register of Historic Places in Union County, Pennsylvania